This is a complete list of the Ministers of Justice in Madagascar:

 Marcel Fournier (1958-1960) [1st Minister of Justice]
Alfred Ramangasoavina (1960-1970)
Jean-Francois Jarison (1970-1971)
Jacques Andrianada (1972-1975)
Georges Thomas Indrianjafy (1976-1982)
Sambson Gilbert  (1982-1988)
Joseph Bedo (1988-1991)
Armand Rajaonarivelo (1992-1993)
Charles Rabetokotany (1994-1995)
Rabendrainy Ramanoelison (1995-1996)
Houssen Abdallah (1996-1997)
 Anaclet Imbiki (1997-2002)
 Alice Rajaonah (2002-2004) [1st female Minister of Justice]
Lala Henriette Ratsiharovala (2004-2007)
Bakolalao Ramanandraibe Ranaivoharivony (2007-2009)
 Christine Razanamahasoa (2009-2013)
 Noëline Ramanantenasoa (2014-2016)
Charles Andriamiseza (2016-2017)
 Elise Alexandrine Rasolo (2017)
 Harimisa Noro Vololona (2018)
 Johnny Richard Andriamahefarivo (2020)

See also 

 Justice ministry

References 

Government of Madagascar

Government ministers of Madagascar
Justice ministries